Eloi Muhoranimana (born April 27, 1999), commonly known for his stage name "Eloi El" is a Rwandan music artist, songwriter and producer.

Eloi is specialized in deep house music which is a sub-genre of Electronic Dance Music (EDM). Eloi has released more than 10 singles & collaborations such as: Magical, Voices, Without you,The Way You Love Me .

Eloi released an Extended Play-EP titled “Africa to the World”, which emerged as the top streamed among his released EPs.

Early life and music career 
Eloi derives inspiration from his family,being born and raised in a family of musicians, including his father who was a member of Orchestra Irangira, his two brothers:Sean Brizz ,Christian Iradukunda known as "Chris Cheetah" who produced various musical tracks in Rwanda.

References

1999 births
Living people
Rwandan musicians